The canton of Villers-Cotterêts is an administrative division in northern France. At the French canton reorganisation which came into effect in March 2015, the canton was expanded from 20 to 76 communes:
 
Ambrief
Ancienville
Arcy-Sainte-Restitue
Armentières-sur-Ourcq
Beugneux
Billy-sur-Ourcq
Bonnesvalyn
Breny
Brumetz
Bussiares
Buzancy
Chacrise
Chaudun
Chézy-en-Orxois
Chouy
Corcy
Courchamps
Coyolles
Cramaille
La Croix-sur-Ourcq
Cuiry-Housse
Dammard
Dampleux
Droizy
Faverolles
La Ferté-Milon
Fleury
Gandelu
Grand-Rozoy
Haramont
Hartennes-et-Taux
Hautevesnes
Largny-sur-Automne
Latilly
Launoy
Licy-Clignon
Longpont
Louâtre
Maast-et-Violaine
Macogny
Marizy-Sainte-Geneviève
Marizy-Saint-Mard
Monnes
Montgobert
Montgru-Saint-Hilaire
Monthiers
Montigny-l'Allier
Muret-et-Crouttes
Nampteuil-sous-Muret
Neuilly-Saint-Front
Noroy-sur-Ourcq
Oigny-en-Valois
Oulchy-la-Ville
Oulchy-le-Château
Parcy-et-Tigny
Passy-en-Valois
Le Plessier-Huleu
Priez
Puiseux-en-Retz
Retheuil
Rozet-Saint-Albin
Rozières-sur-Crise
Saint-Gengoulph
Saint-Rémy-Blanzy
Silly-la-Poterie
Sommelans
Soucy
Taillefontaine
Torcy-en-Valois
Troësnes
Vichel-Nanteuil
Vierzy
Villemontoire
Villers-Cotterêts
Villers-Hélon
Vivières

Demographics

See also
Cantons of the Aisne department

References

Cantons of Aisne